Talbot is an unincorporated community in Marion County, Oregon, United States. It was named after Guy W. Talbot, the first vice-president and general manager of the Oregon Electric Railway Company. The station was first known as Roby, after a pioneer family in the vicinity but the name was changed to Talbot when it became confused with "Ruby" in Multnomah County.

See also
Guy W. Talbot State Park

References
 http://www.oregonpioneers.com/marion/talbot.htm

 

Unincorporated communities in Marion County, Oregon
Unincorporated communities in Oregon